Ciro Ferrara  (born 11 February 1967) is an Italian former footballer and manager. His most recent position was as manager of Wuhan Zall. He had also previously coached Juventus and the Italy national under-21 team. As an assistant coach to Marcello Lippi, he won the 2006 FIFA World Cup with Italy senior team.

Ferrara spent his playing career as a defender, initially at Napoli and later on at Juventus, winning seven total Serie A titles as well as other domestic and international trophies. At international level, he represented Italy at the 1988 Summer Olympics, at two UEFA European Championships, in 1988 and 2000, and at the 1990 World Cup.

Club career

Napoli

A native of Naples, Ferrara began his career with the youth system of hometown club Napoli in 1980. He graduated the primavera youth squad in 1984, and began to earn first team call-ups that season. He made 14 total appearances with the club in his first full season. The following season, Ferrara became a part of the starting XI, and he soon began earning call-ups to the Italy national team, making the squad for the 1990 FIFA World Cup. He also scored one of Napoli's goals as they won the 1989 UEFA Cup final. In addition to the UEFA Cup, with Napoli he won two Serie A titles (in 1986–87 and 1989–90), the 1987 Coppa Italia final, and the 1990 Supercoppa Italiana, the latter over his future team, Juventus.

Juventus
In the summer of 1994, Ferrara transferred to Turin-based club Juventus under coach Marcello Lippi, and was quickly introduced into the starting XI, making over 40 total appearances for the club in all competitions in his first season, scoring one goal. He is considered one of the best central defenders of his generation, not relinquishing his starting position for the club for the next ten years. He also captained the team from 1995 to 1996 and became one of the most experienced and decorated players of the past two decades, winning eight Serie A championships, six of which were with Juventus, and two with Napoli. Ferrara was also part of two Coppa Italia titles (one with each team), three Supercoppa Italiana titles (two with Juventus, one with Napoli) and several European competitions, including the UEFA Champions League, UEFA Cup, Intercontinental Cup and European Super Cup). His role as captain, however, was taken over by Alessandro Del Piero in 1996.

Throughout his Juventus career, Ferrara played an important role in the club's backline, with his vast experienced and dominating defensive style. Throughout his 12-year tenure with the club, Ferrara formed impressive defensive partnerships with the likes of Mark Iuliano, Moreno Torricelli, Paolo Montero, Gianluca Pessotto, Lilian Thuram, Alessandro Birindelli, Igor Tudor, Gianluca Zambrotta, Nicola Legrottaglie and Fabio Cannavaro. Juventus had what was considered as the best defence in the world at this time, and teams strongly regretted ever going down a goal to the club, as they knew how hard it would be to score one back for themselves. In the 1996–97 season, one of his peak seasons, he scored 4 goals in 32 Serie A matches, while also being capped eight times internationally. Following the Scudetto-winning season, Ferrara, along with veteran defensive teammates Mark Iuliano and Paolo Montero, ended their Juventus careers. While Montero returned to Uruguay and Iuliano opted to join smaller clubs to conclude his career, Ferrara retired from football altogether in May 2005 at age 38. He made just four Serie A appearances in his final season with the club. Following Juventus' involvement in the 2006 Italian football scandal, "Calciopoli", Juventus' 2004–05 title was later revoked.

International career
For Italy, Ferrara was capped 49 times and played 1 match each at the 1990 FIFA World Cup on home soil (where Italy finished in third place after a semi-final penalty shootout defeat to Argentina) and at UEFA Euro 2000 (where Italy reached the final, losing to France on a golden goal). Ferrara took part at Euro 1988, where Italy reached the semi-finals, although he did not appear during the tournament. The same year, he was a member of the Italy team that finished in fourth place at the 1988 Summer Olympics after reaching the semi-final.

Style of play
An elegant yet powerful and aggressive defender, Ferrara was known throughout his career for his composure, anticipation, technical skills, ball-playing ability, versatility, and class, which enabled him to play anywhere along the back-line, both in the centre, as a man-marker ("stopper"), or as a full-back, usually on the right flank, and allowed him to adapt to various formations and systems. A world-class defender, who is regarded as one of the best Italian centre-backs of his generation, Welsh former winger Ryan Giggs described Ferrara and his defensive teammate at Juventus Paolo Montero as "...the toughest defenders [he] played against", also adding that they were often very hard in their challenges, while Polish former midfielder Zbigniew Boniek has stated that Ferrara was the best defender he ever faced. A precocious talent in his youth, Ferrara later established himself as one of the best defenders in the world in his prime. He was considered to be a complete, experienced, consistent, cautious and successful defender, with a good positional sense, who was quick, athletic, strong in the air, a good tackler, and who excelled at reading the game and marking his opponents; these skills enabled him to be effective in both a man-marking and a zonal marking defensive system. In addition to his defensive skills, he was also known for his offensive contribution as a centre-back, and was also capable of playing as a sweeper. In spite of his tenacious playing style, he was also known to be a fair and correct player. In addition to his ability as a defender, he was also known for his professionalism, leadership, strong personality, and his commanding presence both on the pitch and in the dressing room.

Coaching career
Ferrara was part of the Italian technical staff for the 2006 World Cup. After winning the World Cup, he became part of Juventus' staff, joining former club and national teammate Gianluca Pessotto, with Ferrara being named youth system chief (responsabile settore giovanile), dealing mostly with organisational aspects of the Juve academy. In July 2008, Ferrara took the UEFA Pro License coaching badges following training at Coverciano, Florence. After Juventus fired Claudio Ranieri following a string of seven league games without a win in the 2008–09 season, Ferrara was named interim head coach of Juventus on 18 May 2009 for the remaining two weeks of the season, with the goal of maintaining second place in the league table, and the possibility of being appointed on a full-time basis for a longer period. In his two games as caretaker manager, he led Juventus to 3–0 and 2–0 wins over Siena and Lazio respectively, thus ensuring a second-place finish over rivals Milan. Following these results, he emerged as a strong candidate for to take the job permanently for the next season. On 5 June 2009, Juventus formally announced his appointment as manager for 2009–10 season.

During the summer, the team was then strengthened with high-profile signings such as Brazilian internationals Diego and Felipe Melo; 2006 World Cup champions Fabio Cannavaro and Fabio Grosso in defence; and young Uruguayan international Martín Cáceres, on loan. After winning his first four league matches, Ferrara's fortunes changed after Juve failed to make the knockout stage of the 2009–10 UEFA Champions League following a 4–1 defeat by Bayern Munich at home in a match where a draw would have awarded Juve the qualification to the following phase, despite a promising start to the campaign. Despite a win over Derby d'Italia rivals Internazionale, Juve embarked on a losing streak over the winter, notably against minor teams such as Sicilian side Catania and recently promoted Bari. He came under intense scrutiny from the media and there was much speculation about who would succeed him as manager, especially after he was absent at the traditional meeting of all Serie A managers, coaches and referees in Rome during mid-season and was instead represented by then-Juventus director of sport Alessio Secco and 23-year-old midfielder Claudio Marchisio at the press conference.

Six days later, Juventus were knocked out of the Coppa Italia by Inter 2–1 at the San Siro, leading the board of directors to ultimately sack Ferrara after weeks of speculation regarding his position, replacing him with Alberto Zaccheroni until the end of the season.

On 22 October 2010, Ferrara was announced as new head coach of the Italy under-21 team, with former teammate Angelo Peruzzi his assistant. Under Ferrara, the Azzurrini remain unbeaten in the 2013 UEFA European U21 Championship qualifiers as of June 2012. On 2 July 2012, he left the country's U-21 side to coach newly promoted Serie A side Sampdoria for the 2012–13 season. However, he was sacked on 17 December 2012.

Personal life
With his fellow Neapolitan friend and former defensive teammate Fabio Cannavaro, Ferrara has helped establish a charity foundation, Fondazione Cannavaro Ferrara, specialising in the procurement of cancer research equipment and surgery for special cases of cancer for a hospital in their native Naples. The foundation also aims to help at risk youth in Naples.

Career statistics

Club

International

Coach

Honours

Player
Napoli
 Serie A: 1986–87, 1989–90
 Coppa Italia: 1986–87
 Supercoppa Italiana: 1990
 UEFA Cup: 1988–89

Juventus
 Serie A: 1994–95, 1996–97, 1997–98, 2001–02, 2002–03
 Coppa Italia: 1994–95
 Supercoppa Italiana: 1995, 1997, 2002, 2003
Intercontinental Cup: 1996
UEFA Champions League: 1995–96
UEFA Champions League: Runner-up: 1996–97, 1997–98, 2002–03
UEFA Cup: Runner-up: 1994–95
UEFA Intertoto Cup: 1999
UEFA Super Cup: 1996

Italy Olympic Team
Summer Olympic Games: Semi-finals: 1988

Italy
UEFA European Championship: Runner-up: 2000
FIFA World Cup: Bronze Medal: 1990
UEFA European Championship: Bronze Medal: 1988

Individual
ESM Team of the Year: 1996–97
FIFA XI (Reserve): 2000
Premio Nazionale Carriera Esemplare "Gaetano Scirea": 2003
Pallone d'Argento: 2003

Orders
 5th Class / Knight: Cavaliere Ordine al Merito della Repubblica Italiana: 1991

 4th Class / Officer: Ufficiale Ordine al Merito della Repubblica Italiana: 2000

Assistant coach
Italy
 FIFA World Cup: 2006

Notes

References

External links
 
 Profile on Italian FA website 

1967 births
Living people
Footballers from Naples
Footballers from Campania
Association football central defenders
Italian footballers
Italy international footballers
Italy under-21 international footballers
Olympic footballers of Italy
Footballers at the 1988 Summer Olympics
Juventus F.C. players
S.S.C. Napoli players
Serie A players
UEFA Euro 1988 players
1990 FIFA World Cup players
UEFA Euro 2000 players
Italian football managers
Juventus F.C. managers
U.C. Sampdoria managers
Serie A managers
Expatriate football managers in China
UEFA Champions League winning players
UEFA Cup winning players
Wuhan F.C. managers
Knights of the Order of Merit of the Italian Republic
Officers of the Order of Merit of the Italian Republic